This is a list of the various animated cartoons featuring Herman and Katnip.

Miscellaneous appearances in the Paramount Picture series and The Baby Huey Show

Herman and Henry in Noveltoon cartoons in the Paramount Picture series 

 The Henpecked Rooster (Feat. Herman the Mouse, Henry the Rooster, and Bertha) February 18, 1944 - Director: Seymour Kneitel (First appearance of Herman)
 Scrappily Married featuring Herman and Henry  (Feat. Herman, Henry, and Bertha) March 30, 1945 - Kneitel (NOTE: Final short released on the World War II.)
 Sudden Fried Chicken featuring Herman and Henry (Feat. Herman, Henry, Bertha) October 18, 1946 - Bill Tytla (NOTE: This cartoon appeared in Smart House.)

Herman's solo appearances in the Paramount Picture series

Main appearances in Noveltoon cartoons 
 Cheese Burglar featuring Herman (Feat. Herman) February 22, 1946 I. Sparber (NOTE: Herman's first solo cartoon. This cartoon appeared in Four Rooms.)
 Campus Capers featuring Herman (Feat. Herman) July 1, 1949 - Tytla

Cameo guest appearance in Popeye the Sailor 

 The Island Fling (Feat. Popeye, Olive Oyl, Tiger, Bluto, Sea Monster, Female Gorilla, Hungry Lion, Friday, Herman the Mouse) December 27, 1946 - Tytla (NOTE: Herman's solo cameo guest appearance in this banned short.)

Supporting appearance as Captain in Screen Songs 
 Gobs of Fun (Feat. Herman, Animals) July 28, 1950 - Sparber

Name only in Casper the Friendly Ghost 
 Ground Hog Play (Feat. Casper, Hillary the groundhog, Shadow Casper, the lion, the boy, Casper's two ghosts, the boys wearing snow suits, the snowman, Hillary's dad, Herman the Mouse [name only]) - February 10, 1956 - Kneitel (NOTE: Only Herman the Mouse's name was shown in this short.)

Buzzy and Katnip in Harveytoon/Noveltoon cartoons in the Paramount Picture series
 The Stupidstitious Cat featuring Buzzy (Feat. proto-Katnip, Buzzy) April 25, 1947 - Kneitel
 Sock-A-Bye Kitty featuring Buzzy (Feat. Katnip, Buzzy) December 2, 1950 - Kneitel
 As The Crow Lies featuring Buzzy (Feat. Katnip, Buzzy the Crow) June 1, 1951 - Kneitel (NOTE: First time, Katnip was voiced by Jack Mercer.)
 Cat-Choo featuring Buzzy and Katnip (Feat. Katnip, Buzzy) October 12, 1951 - Kneitel
 The Awful Tooth featuring Buzzy and Katnip (Feat. Katnip, Buzzy) May 2, 1952 - Kneitel
 Better Bait Than Never featuring Buzzy (Feat. Katnip, Buzzy, Bulldog) June 5, 1953 - Kneitel (NOTE: Final short released on the Korean War.)
 Hair Today Gone Tomorrow featuring Buzzy (Feat. Katnip, Buzzy) April 16, 1954 - Kneitel (NOTE: Katnip's final appearance in the Harveytoon/Noveltoon short in the Paramount Picture series.)

Proto-Katnip's solo in a Noveltoon short 
 Hep Cat Symphony (Feat. Proto-Katnip, the mousetro and his orchestra) February 4, 1949 - Kneitel (NOTE: Proto-Katnip's only solo appearance.)

Katnip's solo in Harveytoon/Noveltoon shorts in the Paramount Picture series 
 City Kitty (Feat. Katnip, the mice, the ants, the fish family, the mosquitos) July 18, 1952 - Sparber (Katnip's first solo appearance.)
 Feast And Furious featuring Finny (Feat. Finny, Katnip) December 26, 1952 - Sparber

Katnip's solo guest in The Baby Huey Show episode segments 
 Self Help Huey (Feat. Baby Huey, the fox, Katnip, animals) October 28, 1995 - Joe Horne
 Three Ducks and a Dope (Feat. Baby Huey, three ducks, one of them's mom, the fox, his female, Papa Duck, Mama Duck [cameo in Huey's tattoo], Katnip [cameo], additional of them) November 18, 1995 - Steve Loter

Herman and Katnip 1947, 1950–59 in the Paramount Picture series

Herman and Proto-Katnip in Noveltoon shorts in the Paramount Picture series
 Naughty But Mice featuring Herman (Feat. Herman, proto-Katnip, Reuben, Deuben, Louie, his additional cousins) October 10, 1947 - Kneitel
 Saved by the Bell featuring Herman (Feat. Herman, proto-Katnip, Reuben, Deuben, Louie, his additional cousins) September 15, 1950 - Kneitel (NOTE: First short released in the Korean War.)

Herman and Official Katnip in Harveytoon/Noveltoon shorts in the Paramount Picture series
 Mice Meeting You featuring Herman (Feat. Herman, Katnip, Reuben, Deuben, Louie, his additional cousins) November 10, 1950 - Kneitel (NOTE: Katnip's first official appearance.)
 Mice Paradise featuring Herman (Feat. Herman, Katnip) March 9, 1951 - Sparber
 Cat Tamale featuring Herman and Katnip (Feat. Herman, Katnip, Other Mice) November 9, 1951 - Kneitel
 Cat Carson Rides Again featuring Herman and Katnip (Feat. Herman, Katnip, Other Mice) April 4, 1952 - Kneitel

Herman and Katnip short films in the Paramount Picture series
 Mice-Capades (Feat. Herman, Katnip) October 3, 1952 - Kneitel (NOTE: First Herman and Katnip short in the Paramount Picture series.)
 Of Mice And Magic (Feat. Herman, Katnip, Louise, Other Mice, and Finny the Goldfish) February 20, 1953 - Sparber (NOTE: Second and cameo appearance of Finny the Goldfish.)
 Herman The Catoonist (Feat. Herman, Katnip, and Other Mice) May 15, 1953 - Sparber
 Drinks On The Mouse (Feat. Herman, Katnip) August 28, 1953 - Dave Tendlar
 Northwest Mousie (Feat. Herman, Katnip, and Other Mice) December 28, 1953 - Kneitel
 Surf And Sound (Feat. Herman, Katnip, Louise The Girl Mouse, and Other Mice) March 5, 1954 - Tendlar
 Of Mice And Menace (Feat. Herman, Katnip, and Herman's Nephews) June 25, 1954 - Kneitel (NOTE: Jackson Beck voiced Herman.)
 Ship A-Hooey (Feat. Herman, Katnip, and Other Mice) August 20, 1954 - Sparber
 Rail-Rodents (Feat. Herman, Katnip, Bulldog) November 26, 1954 - Tendlar (NOTE: This is a second time that Herman doesn't speak; second appearance of the bulldog.)
 Robin Rodenthood (Feat. Herman, Katnip, and Other Mice) February 25, 1955 - Tendlar (NOTE: Jackson Beck voiced Herman.)
 A Bicep Built For Two (Feat. Herman, Katnip, and Spike) April 8, 1955 - Kneitel (NOTE: Jackson Beck voiced Herman.)
 Mouse Trapeze (Feat. Herman, Katnip, and Herman's Nephews) August 5, 1955 - Sparber
 Mousieur Herman (Feat. Herman, Katnip) November 25, 1955 - Tendlar (first with shorter instrumental theme music)
 Mouseum (Feat. Herman, Katnip, and Herman's Nephews) February 24, 1956 - Kneitel
 Will Do Mousework (Feat. Herman, Katnip, and Herman's Cousins) June 29, 1956 - Knietel
 Mousetro Herman (Feat. Herman, Katnip, and Other Mice) August 10, 1956 - Sparber (NOTE: NEW THEME DEBUTS EARLY)
 Hide And Peak (Feat. Herman, Katnip) December 10, 1956 - Tendlar 
 Cat In The Act (Feat. Herman, Katnip) February 22, 1957 - Tendlar (NOTES:last Famous Studios NEW THEME DEBUTS)
 Sky Scrappers (Feat. Herman, Katnip) June 14, 1957 - Tendlar (NOTE: Third time, Katnip was voiced by Jack Mercer. First was, As the Crow Lies. Second was, Feast and Furious.)
 From Mad To Worse (Feat. Herman, Katnip, and Other Mice) August 16, 1957 - Kneitel (NOTE: NEW INTRO ANIMATION DEBUTS)
 One Funny Knight (Feat. Herman, Katnip, and Princess Genevieve) November 22, 1957 - Tendlar
 Frighty Cat (Feat. Herman, Katnip, and Other Mice) March 14, 1958 - Sparber (NOTE: Sid Raymond last regularly voiced Katnip.)
 You Said A Mouseful (Feat. Herman, Katnip, and Chubby) August 29, 1958 - Kneitel (NOTE: Fourth time, Katnip was voiced by Jack Mercer and first time Katnip ends on a happy note.)
 Owly To Bed (Feat. Herman, Katnip, and Hooty) January 2, 1959 - Kneitel (NOTE: Katnip only screams and Herman only imitates him saying, "Hooty, get out of there!")
 Felineous Assault (Feat. Herman, Katnip, and Kitnip) February 6, 1959 - Kneitel (NOTE: Jack Mercer voiced Herman for a second time. First was, Sudden Fried Chicken.)
 Fun On Furlough (Featuring Herman, Katnip, and Other Mice) April 3, 1959 - Kneitel (NOTE: Jack Mercer voiced Katnip for a fifth time. This is the only Herman and Katnip wartime cartoon.)
 Katnip's Big Day (Feat. Herman, Katnip, Buzzy, Rueben, Dueben, Louie, Spike, and Butch) October 30, 1959 - Kneitel (NOTE: This is a final Herman and Katnip short in the Paramount Picture series and the second cartoon that ends happily for Katnip.)

Guest appearances in Casper the Friendly Ghost
 Ghost of Honor (Feat. Casper, Celebrities, Paramount Artists, Wolfie, Herman, Katnip, Spunky, Tommy Tortoise, Moe Hare, Pal, Baby Huey, Little Audrey and other Harvey cartoon characters) July 19, 1957 - Sparber (NOTE: Herman and Katnip's only guest appearances in this short along with their others.)

References

External links

Herman
Herman